Calhoun is an unincorporated community in Lowndes County, Alabama, United States.

History
A post office operated under the name Calhoun from 1851 to 1973.

Calhoun was formerly home to the Calhoun Colored School, a private boarding and day school.

Ramah Baptist Church in Calhoun is listed on the Alabama Register of Landmarks and Heritage.

Notable natives
 Sidney Dickinson, painter
 William K. Payne, president of Georgia State College from 1949 until his death in 1963
 Tommy Sampson, second baseman in the Negro leagues

References

Unincorporated communities in Lowndes County, Alabama
Unincorporated communities in Alabama